Travels is the Pat Metheny Group's first live album, released in 1983. It won the Grammy Award for Best Jazz Fusion Performance.

The album consists of live material recorded in July, October, and November 1982, in Philadelphia, Dallas, Sacramento, Hartford, and Nacogdoches (Texas). The Group for this album consisted of Pat Metheny, Lyle Mays, Steve Rodby, Dan Gottlieb, and guest Nana Vasconcelos.

It was voted number 570 in the third edition of Colin Larkin's All Time Top 1000 Albums (2000).

Travels was recorded as part of the tour for the Group's 1982 studio album, Offramp, but also featured previously unrecorded and unreleased songs.

In the liner notes for his ECM Rarum compilation album, Metheny expressed great love for the live rendition of "Are You Going with Me?" and appreciated the audience for whom it was played in Philadelphia.

The track "Song for Bilbao", dedicated to audiences in Bilbao, Spain, was often played as an encore.

Track listing

Personnel
 Pat Metheny – acoustic and electric guitars, guitar synthesizer
 Lyle Mays – piano, synthesizers, electric organ, autoharp, Synclavier
 Steve Rodby – acoustic and electric bass, bass synthesizer
 Danny Gottlieb – drums
 Nana Vasconcelos – percussion, voice, berimbau
Technical staff
 Randy Ezratty – recording

Charts

Awards
Grammy Awards

References

Pat Metheny live albums
1983 live albums
ECM Records live albums
Albums produced by Manfred Eicher
Grammy Award for Best Jazz Fusion Performance